AHB may refer to:

 Al Hilal Bank
 Abha Airport in Abha, Saudi Arabia
 Africanized honeybee
 Air Historical Branch, the historical archive service of the Royal Air Force
 All Hallows, Bow, a church in East London
 AMBA High-performance Bus, internal bus for microcontrollers
 Auckland Harbour Bridge in Auckland, New Zealand
 Axamb language
 Automatic Half Barrier, a term used in the UK for a type of level crossing
 Advanced High-performance Bus
A Happy Birthday